The entepicondylar foramen is an opening in the distal (far) end of the humerus (upper arm bone) present in some mammals. It is often present in primitive placentals, such as the enigmatic Madagascan Plesiorycteropus. In most Neotominae and all Tylomyinae among cricetid rodents, it is located above the medial epicondyle of the humerus, but it is absent in all Sigmodontinae and Arvicolinae and this trait has been suggested as a synapomorphy for the former subfamily.

See also
 Supratrochlear foramen

References

Literature cited

 

Mammal anatomy